Edwin Lewis Snyder (July 2, 1887 – March 28, 1969) was an architect and pioneer in the use of Spanish Colonial Revival Style architecture, building homes in Northern California for decades from the early to mid-twentieth century. The Snyder-designed Berkeley Community YWCA, built in 1930, is on the city's historical register; the Roy O. Long Co. Building, built in 1927, is on the California Historical Resources Inventory.
Along with Frederick L. Confer (designer of the Tao House), Snyder designed several “western colonial” homes during the depression. In 1851, Snyder designed the  Alpha Delta Pi sorority house in Berkeley, excluding architect’s fees, the English cottage style structure was made for $27,500.

Biography

Snyder was born on July 2, 1887, in Stockton, California. He married Dorian Ethel Wright on January 18, 1913, in San Francisco, California. He received his degree in architecture from the University of California, Berkeley in 1909. He was strongly influenced by a six-week visit to Majorca, a Spanish island in the Mediterranean, where he visited Palma (Majorca), Deià, Estellencs, and Formentor. He found homes he described as “architecturally perfect” featuring pergolas, Dado (architecture), tile roofs, windows that ran to the floor, with white-washed finishes.  These features were included in his later California works.

Snyder’s designs placed first and second in the 1932 Small House Exhibition in Oakland, California. The first place award was for a ranch house built for his colleague Confer; it featured typical traits of early California architecture—a clay tile roof, a large brick fireplace, and a sunroom. In 1935, editors of Sunset Magazine reviewed the design of Snyder's own home: "By skillful planning and execution, Mr. Snyder has achieved a house that has all of the informal charm of a tiny cottage and at the same time the spaciousness that comes in larger dwellings."  Landscape architect Garrett Eckbo designed the landscaping for the house, which has a view of the San Francisco Bay from the Berkeley Hills.

An advocate of housing for low-income families, Snyder designed low-cost homes for the National Housing Bureau. He emphasized that low-income housing should have standard design elements, but different architectural design.

A veteran of both World War I and II, Snyder operated his own architecture practice in Carmel-by-the-Sea, California, from 1942 to 1961, when he moved to Lodi, California to retire. He was a former member and past president of the Architectural Honor Society. In Carmel, he designed the Spinning Wheel Restaurant in 1952.

Death
He died in on March 28, 1969, in Lodi, California, at the age of 81, and was buried there.

Further reading
Small California House First Choice in Vote at Oakland Exhibit, The Architect and Engineer, 108:46-51 February 1932
Stafford L. Jory, A New Sorority House in Berkeley, The Architect and Engineer, 110:10, 12-17, August 1932
"Edwin Lewis Snyder, Spain’s Magic Island, The Architect and Engineer, 110:10, 37-45, August 1932
Helen Bell Grady, Colonial in a Western Setting, 73:4, 9-11, Sunset Magazine, September 1934
Tucked Away in the Hills of Berkeley, Sunset Magazine, 74-75(3), 12-13, March 1935
Recent Houses by Edwin Lewis Snyder, Architect, The Architect and Engineer, 125: 21-28, June 1936
Edwin Lewis Snyder, Housing Shortage in California at Critical Stage, The Architect and Engineer, 133:24-29, April 1938

External links
In New Houses, Sunset Magazine, 76-77(6), 26-27, June 1936.
"Edwin Snyder Taken by Death", Lodi News Sentinel, March 29, 1969.
Writers' Program (Calif.), Federal Writers' Project, Berkeley: the first seventy-five years, AMS Press, 1975
Berkeley Landmarks, Designated by the Landmarks Preservation Commission, Berkeley, CA
Google Map of Homes Designed by Edwin Lewis Snyder in Oakland and Berkeley, CA
Edwin Lewis Snyder Architect

See also
List of American architects

References

Architects from California
Mediterranean Revival architects
Spanish Colonial Revival architects
Spanish Revival architects
Spanish Colonial Revival architecture in California
1969 deaths
1887 births
UC Berkeley College of Environmental Design alumni